Santiago de Callapa Municipality or Callapa Municipality is the eighth municipal section of the Pacajes Province in the  La Paz Department, Bolivia. Its seat is Callapa.

See also 
 Ch'alla Jawira
 Llallawa Jawira

References 
 www.ine.gov.bo / census 2001: Santiago de Callapa Municipality

External links 
 Map of the Pacajes Province

Municipalities of La Paz Department (Bolivia)